Eskebornite is a selenide mineral with the formula CuFeSe2. It crystallizes in the tetragonal system and it has a brassy colour. Eskebornite is sometimes found as thick tabular crystals, but is more often found intergrown with other selenides. It is part of the chalcopyrite group and forms a series with chalcopyrite.

Occurrence 
Eskebornite was first identified in 1949 by Paul Ramdohr in the Eskaborn Adit, Tilkerode (Abberode), Harz, Saxony-Anhalt, Germany, which it was also named after. It is often found with other selenides, including clausthalite, tiemannite, berzelianite, naumannite, umangite, geffroyite, and chaméanite, but also with other minerals like chalcopyrite, uraninite, ankerite, and dolomite.

See also 
 List of minerals

References 

Copper minerals
Iron minerals
Selenide minerals
Tetragonal minerals
Minerals in space group 112
Minerals described in 1949